Shin Creek flows into Beaver Kill by Lew Beach, New York.

References

Rivers of New York (state)
Rivers of Ulster County, New York
Rivers of Sullivan County, New York
Tributaries of the East Branch Delaware River